Karel Havlík (6 August 1944 – 17 November 2021) was a Czech politician. A member of KDU-ČSL, he was a minister without portfolio in the Czech and Slovak Federative Republic in 1990.

References

1944 births
2021 deaths
Czech politicians
KDU-ČSL Government ministers
People from Hodonín District